Kamikurizawagawa Dam is a gravity dam located in Yamanashi Prefecture in Japan. The dam is used for power production. The catchment area of the dam is 34.3 km2. The dam impounds about 1  ha of land when full and can store 9 thousand cubic meters of water. The construction of the dam was started on 1926 and completed in 1927.

References

Dams in Yamanashi Prefecture
1927 establishments in Japan